"Black Island" is a song by Cuba with vocals by Shara Nelson released as a single in 1999 on 4AD.

Track listing

UK CD Single

 Black Island 4:01
 Black Island (Isla Negra) 5:50
 Black Island (Groove Armada's Desert Island Disc) 7:46

References

External links

1999 singles
Shara Nelson songs
4AD singles
1999 songs
Song articles with missing songwriters